Seema Azmi (also known as "Seema") is an Indian film and theater actress.

Biography 

Seema Azmi was born in Guwahati, Assam, India, with Azamgarh origin, and was brought up in Delhi where she  completed her schooling and graduated from Delhi university. She joined the National School of Drama in Delhi.

Azmi joined Asmita theatre group, Delhi in 1996. Her plays include Girish Karnad's Rakt Kalyan (Taledanda), Mahesh Dattani's Final Solutions, Ek Mamooli Aadmi, Swadesh Deepak's Court Martial, and Dario Fo's Accidental Death of an Anarchist.

Filmography

References

External links 
 
 
 interview-Seema-Azmi
 Seema Azmi's theatre career

Bahu- Rani  [http://www.boloji.com/index.cfm?md=Content&sd=Articles&ArticleID=12616

Living people
Actresses from Guwahati
National School of Drama alumni
Actresses in Hindi cinema
Indian film actresses
Indian stage actresses
Year of birth missing (living people)
21st-century Indian actresses
People from Azamgarh